"I Got Dreams" is a song co-written and recorded by American country music artist Steve Wariner.  It was released in June 1989 as the second single and title track from the album I Got Dreams.  The song was the ninth and final number one on the country chart for Wariner as a solo artist.  The single went to number one for one week and spent a total of fifteen weeks on the country chart.  Wariner wrote the song with Bill LaBounty.

Critical reception
In his book Country Music: A Biographical Dictionary, Richard Carlin wrote that the song was "jazzy" and said that its inclusion of scat singing made it a "novelty" for country music.

Chart performance

Year-end charts

References

1989 singles
Steve Wariner songs
Songs written by Bill LaBounty
Songs written by Steve Wariner
Song recordings produced by Jimmy Bowen
MCA Records singles
1989 songs